Teileann (an Irish word meaning 'Dish'; anglicised as Teelin) is a Gaeltacht village in the south-west of County Donegal in the west of Ulster, the northern province in Ireland. The village is near Slieve League, at the northwest end of Donegal Bay. Its population is about 250–300.

The village is noted for fishing, scuba diving, and traditional music. It has a fine deep harbour at Teelin Pier, which has boat launching facilities with safe mooring. The pier was built in the early 1880s. It is an Irish-speaking community, and has been the subject of many linguistic studies.

Teileann (pronounced as 'Chellin') means 'Dish' in the Irish language. The 'dish' being referenced here is the part of Teelin Bay beside Teelin Pier, this part of the bay being circular like a dish or plate.

Teelin is home to Coláiste Aoidh Mhic Bhricne, an Irish language college which attracts teenagers from across the province of Ulster. The college has been open in its current existence since 1955.

Teelin was one of the first settlements to appear on maps of Ireland, as it was an important port.

The folklorist Seán Ó hEochaidh (Seán Haughey) was from Teelin.

See also
 Battle of Doire Leathan - fought near Teelin on 14 September 1590. The battle was fought in Doire Leathan (Derrylahan), a townland on the opposite shore of Teelin Bay.
 List of towns and villages in the Republic of Ireland
 Slieve League

References

Gaeltacht places in County Donegal
Gaeltacht towns and villages
Towns and villages in County Donegal